Gina L. Gershon (born June 10, 1962) is an American actress. She has had roles in the films Cocktail (1988), Red Heat (1988), Showgirls (1995), Bound (1996), Face/Off (1997), The Insider (1999), Demonlover (2002), P.S. I Love You (2007), Five Minarets in New York (2010), Killer Joe (2011) and House of Versace (2013). She has also had supporting roles in FX's Rescue Me and HBO's How to Make It in America. She portrayed Gladys Jones on The CW teen drama series Riverdale.

Early life
Gershon was born in Los Angeles, to Mickey Gershon (née Koppel), an interior decorator, and Stan Gershon, who worked in the import-export business and sales. She was raised in a Jewish family in Los Angeles's San Fernando Valley. She has an older brother and an older sister.

Gershon went to Collier Street Elementary School and Woodland Hills Academy (formerly Parkman Junior High). She attended Beverly Hills High School and started acting at the age of 14. After graduating from high school in 1980, she moved to Boston to attend Emerson College. She transferred to New York University, and graduated with a BFA in drama and psychology/philosophy in 1983.

She has said she always wanted to be an actress, but her career began in music and dance.

Career

Theatre
Gershon attended the Circle in the Square Professional Theater School in New York, working first with David Mamet and later with Harold Guskin and Sandra Seacat, whom she has described in interviews as "a huge influence." Her first professional acting was in stage productions of Camille and The Substance of Fire.

She is one of the founding members of the New York-based theater group Naked Angels.

She has appeared on Broadway three times: as Sally Bowles in the revival of Cabaret; in the revival of the sex farce Boeing-Boeing; and as Rosie Alvarez in the 2010 revival of Bye Bye Birdie at the Roundabout Theatre Company.

Film 

Her break came with a bit part in Pretty in Pink (1986), which led to more substantial roles in Sweet Revenge with Nancy Allen, Cocktail with Tom Cruise and Elisabeth Shue, and John Sayles' urban drama City of Hope (1991). Also in 1991, she appeared in the action film Out for Justice opposite Steven Seagal, where she played Patti Madano, sister of the film's villain, Richie Madano (William Forsythe). Gershon also worked in television, with a recurring role on Melrose Place playing a prostitute working for a Heidi Fleiss-esque Hollywood madam.

In 1996 she played Corky, an ex-con who gets mixed up in an affair with Violet (played by Jennifer Tilly) in the mobster flick Bound. In 1997 she co-starred with John Travolta and Nicolas Cage in Face/Off.

Gershon is regarded as a gay icon for her roles in films such as Bound (in which she played a butch lesbian), Prey for Rock & Roll, and Showgirls (in which she played a bisexual showgirl, and which is regarded as a camp classic). She was ranked #51 on the Maxim Hot 100 Women of 2004.

In 2011, Gershon appeared alongside Matthew McConaughey in Killer Joe, a dark comedy/thriller featuring director William Friedkin.

In 2017, Gershon starred in Bad Kids of Crestview Academy directed by Ben Browder, Lost Cat Corona directed by Anthony Tarsitano, the romantic comedy-drama Permission opposite Dan Stevens and Rebecca Hall directed by Brian Crano, Gershon co-starred alongside Nicolas Cage in the thriller Inconceivable,  thriller film directed by Jonathan Baker, That same year, she starred in 9/11 directed by Martin Guigui revolving around the September 11 attacks opposite Whoopi Goldberg, Luis Guzmán and Charlie Sheen. The film was panned by critics and faced controversy for Sheen's history with the 911 Truth movement, a conspiracy theory. Gershon stated she was unaware of Sheen's comments during production of the film and would have spoken with Sheen and Guigui before agreeing to star.

In 2018, Gershon starred in the adventure drama American Dresser directed by Carmine Cangialosi, which was critically panned. Gershon then starred in the drama film After Everything directed by Hannah Marks and Joey Power, opposite Maika Monroe and Jeremy Allen White. The film had its world premiere at South by Southwest in March 2018, and was released in October 2018, to critical acclaim. She also had a small role in comedy Blockers directed by Kay Cannon, which was released on April 6, 2018, to critical and commercial success.

In 2020, Gershon starred in the sports film Cagefighter: Worlds Collide directed by Jesse Quinones. Gershon next starred in Rifkin's Festival directed by Woody Allen. Following backlash for starring in the film, Gershon defended her decision to star in the film stating: "I don't believe that to be true. You should really do all of the research and read all of the articles before believing that. It's really important to make up your own mind and not go by what the masses claim. I've done extensive research and I can say with very clear conscience that I'm so happy to be working with him. This man is not a sexual predator." Gershon also called working on the film "a dream come true". Gershon will also star in With/In an anthology film set during the COVID-19 pandemic directing from a screenplay she wrote.

TV and online work
She portrayed Nancy Barbato, Frank Sinatra's 1st wife in the made-for-TV biopic Sinatra, in 1992. Gershon next had a recurring role on Melrose Place playing a prostitute working for a Heidi Fleiss-esque Hollywood madam. Gershon made a guest appearance as herself on The Larry Sanders Show. Gershon next starred in the lead role of Glenn Hall in ABC's detective series Snoops created by David E. Kelley, which was cancelled after one season.

Gershon has made numerous guest and recurring appearances on various shows including HBO's comedy series Curb Your Enthusiasm, FX's comedy-drama Rescue Me, ABC's Ugly Betty, USA Network's Psych, A recurring role on HBO's How to Make It in America. 

Gershon voiced the role of Six in the adult animation series Tripping the Rift. Gershon also voiced the role of Catwoman in the 2007 animated series The Batman. From 2017 to 2018, Gershon voiced the role of Langwidere in Lost in Oz. 

In 2013, Gershon starred in the television film House of Versace as Donatella Versace, which premiered on Lifetime. Gershon's performance earned praise from fashion critic Cathy Horyn. That same year, Gershon began starring in the Crackle action series Cleaners.

In 2015, Gershon made a guest appearance on Glee in the sixth and final season as Blaine's mother. From 2015 to 2017, Gershon had a recurring role on Amazon Prime Video's Red Oaks. She also appeared in two episodes of Elementary. That same year, Gershon had a recurring role on Z Nation. In 2016, Gershon guest starred on Empire. In 2017, Gershon guest starred on the HBO comedy series Crashing. That same year, Gershon had a recurring role in Brooklyn Nine-Nine as the villainous Lt. Melanie Hawkins. Gershon was cast in the E! dark comedy pilot #Fashionvictim opposite Willa Fitzgerald, which was not picked up to series. Since 2018, Gershon has had a recurring role on The CW drama Riverdale portraying the role of Jughead Jones's mother, Gladys. That same year, Gershon made a guest appearance on Younger.

In 2020, Gershon had a recurring role on New Amsterdam.

Gershon has appeared in two videos on FunnyorDie.com parodying former Republican vice presidential nominee Sarah Palin, titled "Gina Gershon Strips Down Sarah Palin", and "Gina Gershon Does Sarah Palin 2". In 2016, Gershon parodied Melania Trump in a Funny or Die video "A Message from Melania Trump". Gershon additionally has played Trump on an episode of The Tonight Show Starring Jimmy Fallon, An Off-Broadway play, "The 1st Annual Trump Family Special". and in an episode of CBS All Access's The Good Fight.

Music
Gershon played Jaw harp on "I Can't Decide", a song on the Scissor Sisters 2006 release Ta-Dah. She also played Jaw harp on the song "I Do It For Your Love", Paul Simon's collaboration with Herbie Hancock on his album Possibilities, in a duo with bassist Christian McBride on the song "Chitlins and Gefiltefish", on McBride's 2011 album Conversations with Christian, and on "Maria" from her album In Search of Cleo.

She had a cameo role in The Cars 1984 music video "Hello Again" alongside Andy Warhol, and appeared in Lenny Kravitz's music video "Again".

Books
Gershon and her brother Dan are the authors of the children's book Camp Creepy Time.

Gershon's first book written for adults, In Search of Cleo: How I Found My Pussy and Lost My Mind, is the true story of the hunt for her runaway cat and was released on October 11, 2012.

Personal life
From 2015 to 2018, Gershon was in a relationship with Belgian entrepreneur and former footballer, Robert Dekeyser.

Filmography

Film

Television

Theater

Music

Podcast

References

External links

 
 
 
 
 
 

1962 births
Actresses from Los Angeles
American women singers
American film actresses
American stage actresses
American television actresses
American voice actresses
American women writers
Circle in the Square Theatre School alumni
Emerson College alumni
Jewish American actresses
Living people
20th-century American actresses
21st-century American actresses
Tisch School of the Arts alumni